Something Might Happen (2003) is a novel by Julie Myerson about a murder in a small English seaside town and how it affects the community as well as friends and family of the murder victim. The story is not a whodunnit although it incorporates various elements of the crime novel. The first person narrator is Tess, a 39-year-old osteopath and mother of four who was also the victim's closest friend.

One Monday night in early October, Leonora Daniels ("Lennie") is brutally murdered on her way home from a PTA meeting. Without sexually assaulting her, her killer cuts her heart out of her body and disappears with it, leaving Lennie's mutilated body there in a car park near the seafront.

The first reaction of the townspeople is shock: They have always considered the place a safe town where you do not even have to lock up during the day. However, they easily adapt to the changing circumstances. More people, most of them police, means more business, so opening hours are extended and new stock is ordered. 

It soon turns out that the police do not have any clue as to the identity of the murderer. Human nature is longing to put the blame on someone -- anyone --, so Darren Sims, the 17-year-old village idiot, is chosen as their scapegoat, but the police, hopeful at first, have to clear him of any suspicion.

The murder and the hunt for the killer upset the lives of two families in particular: On the one hand, there is Alex Daniels and his two young sons; on the other hand, Mick and Tess and their four children are also badly affected by what is happening in the wake of the tragedy. Alex, who is a furniture designer, insists on making his wife's coffin himself. Tess, whose youngest is only five months old, is curiously attracted to Ted Lacey, a young man working for the police who is trained to offer 24-hour psychological support to Alex and his boys. At the same time she is confronted with her own atheism when she is asked by one of the kids where Lennie now is -- in heaven or at the morgue. Mick, Tess's husband, half-heartedly plans to leave his family, no matter how much they are already suffering.

Tess's 11-year-old daughter Rosa tries to cope with the unexpected and violent death by claiming she can still see Lennie and communicate with her. On the night before the funeral, Rosa ventures out on a groyne, seemingly to be closer to her dead maternal friend, but falls into the water and drowns, while her mother is committing adultery with Lacey in a beach hut not far away.

No great changes occur after that. Mick, Tess and their three remaining kids move away from the seaside town while Alex marries again. Tess wonders briefly if she will ever see Ted Lacey again.

2003 novels